Arta is one of the regional units of Greece. It is part of the Epirus region. Its capital is the town of Arta.

Geography

The regional unit of Arta is located north of the Ambracian Gulf. The main mountain ranges are the Athamanika in the northeast, the Pindus in the east, and Valtou in the southeast. Only one mountain road links Arta with the Pineios valley and Thessaly. There are low-lying agricultural plains in the west. Arta borders on the regional units of Preveza in the west, Ioannina to the north, Trikala in the east, Karditsa to the east and Aetolia-Acarnania to the south.

The main rivers are the Acheloos in the east, the Arachthos in the centre, and the Louros in the west. Most of the population lives in the west, in the Arachthos valley, south and east of Arta. The Athamanika and Valtou mountains are the least populated.

Administration

The regional unit Arta is subdivided into 4 municipalities. These are (number as in the map in the infobox):
Arta (1)
Central Tzoumerka (Kentrika Tzoumerka, 3)
Georgios Karaiskakis (2)
Nikolaos Skoufas (4)

Prefecture

Arta was established as a prefecture in 1882. As a part of the 2011 Kallikratis government reform, the regional unit Arta was created out of the former prefecture Arta. The prefecture had the same territory as the present regional unit. At the same time, the municipalities were reorganised, according to the table below.

History
Arta was one of the capitals of the Despotate of Epirus in the late Middle Ages. The territory of the regional unit was ceded to Greece in 1881 by the Ottoman Empire, along with Thessaly, in accordance with the 1878 Congress of Berlin. A famous landmark of Arta is the Old Bridge over the Arachthos river.

Transport

As one of the first completed sections of the future Ionia Odos linking Ioannina with Patras and Kalamata, the motorway bypass of the GR-5 around Arta was opened in 1997. The main highways are:

Greek National Road 5/E55, S, Cen., W
Greek National Road 21, W
Greek National Road 30, Cen., E

Sporting teams

Anagennisi Artas

People

 Pyrrhus (318 BC-272 BC) general and king of Epirus
 Epicrates of Ambracia, 4th BC comic poet
 Silanus of Ambracia
 Epigonus of Ambracia 6th-5th BC musician
 Georgios Karaiskakis Years of service 1796 - 1827 Rank - General, Battles/wars Greek War of Independence
 Maximus the Greek (c. 1475-1556) publicist, writer, scholar, humanist and translator
 Napoleon Zervas (1891–1957)
 Theodoros Tzinis
 Nikolaos Skoufas
 Yannis Makriyannis
 Kostas Kristallis poet
 Yiannis Moralis (1916) painter
 Antonios Nikopolidis (1971) footballer
 Yannis Anastasiou (1973) footballer
 Nikos Rizos (1924 - April 20, 1999), actor

See also
List of settlements in the Arta regional unit

References

External links
https://web.archive.org/web/20040602225531/http://www.culture.gr/maps/ipiros/arta/arta.html

 
Prefectures of Greece
Regional units in Epirus (region)